Alloclionites is a genus of extinct ammonoid cephalopods within the family Clionitidae which is part of the ceratitid superfamily Clydonitoidea. Alloclionites comes from the Upper Triassic of the Alps, Balkans, Himalayas, Timor, and British Columbia and is recognized by its many tubercles which tend to diminish on the body chamber.

References 

 Treatise on Invertebrate Paleontology, part L, Ammonoidea; Geological Society of America and the University of Kansas Press. p L160 and rel.

Ceratitida genera
Triassic ammonites of Europe
Clydonitaceae